Holzminden internment camp was a large World War I detention camp (Internierungslager) located to the north-east of Holzminden, Lower Saxony, Germany, which existed from 1914 to 1918. It held civilian internees from allied nations. It was the largest internment camp in Germany, and in October 1918 held 4,240 civilians.

It is not to be confused with Holzminden prisoner-of-war camp, a much smaller camp for British and British Empire officers, which occupied a former cavalry barracks nearer the centre of the town, and which existed from September 1917 to December 1918.

The camp
The camp contained approximately 120 huts, and was surrounded by a perimeter fence dominated by watchtowers. It was made up of two compounds, one for men, and one for about 500 women and children. During the day, the women and children were allowed to enter the main compound.  

The inmates mainly comprised Polish, Russian, Belgian and French nationals, many of the French being from Alsace-Lorraine; and later Serbians and Romanians. Among them was the Belgian historian, Henri Pirenne; and the Belgian courtier, Count Charles John d'Oultremont. In November 1916 the camp received 300 civilians from northern France, followed by another 600 in January 1918: many of these were members of local elites, who were effectively being held by the Germans as hostages. A small number of British internees were also held, including five stewardesses from the Great Eastern Railway ferry SS Brussels.

Although conditions in the camp were harsh, inmates were able to receive mail and food parcels. They developed their own communal facilities, including a "university", chapels, a school for the children, a café, and a photographic studio. Theatrical performances and concerts were held.

The practice of internment 
During the First World War, the allied nations also practised the displacement and internment of enemy nationals. Around fifty internment camps existed in France between 1914 and 1919: they received in total over 40,000 German-speaking civilians (many from Germany and Austria-Hungary, but also including about 8,000 civilians from Alsace-Lorraine), in various capacities and for varying durations. Great Britain detained more than 30,000 foreigners during the conflict. Targeted deportations, such as that of hundreds of prominent citizens from northern France to Holzminden between November 1916 and April 1917, were probably designed to discourage acts of resistance in the occupied regions, and to strengthen the Germans' hand in negotiating civilian exchanges.

See also
 World War I prisoners of war in Germany
 List of prisoner-of-war camps in Germany
 List of concentration and internment camps
 Ruhleben internment camp

References

Bibliography
 2012791670

External links

 Site on military prisoners and civilian internees at Holzminden, principally in the internment camp

German Empire in World War I
World War I internment camps
World War I sites in Germany
 
Internment camps in Germany
Holzminden (district)